Northeastern Connecticut, better known as the Quiet Corner, is a historic region of the state of Connecticut, located in the northeastern corner of the state. It is generally associated with Windham County, but also sometimes incorporates eastern sections of Tolland County and the northern portion of New London County.

Description

The Quiet Corner has historically been maintained as a colloquial, somewhat nebulous term, likely originating sometime in the middle of the 20th Century, and has often been subject to interpretation by outsiders and residents alike. Indeed, there is no official definition for the Quiet Corner, but owing to its common use in day-to-day parlance amongst Connecticut residents and in organization and business names of the area, its existence as a regional identifier laying outside of de jure boundaries of Connecticut's counties cannot be ignored. In an attempt to roughly define the region, an occasionally cited, but debatable boundary marker for the region is the semi-rural town of Coventry, which is more rustic than the more suburban towns to the West. It can be said that the Quiet Corner's identity has much to do with its lack of direct association to the state's major cities and towns such as Hartford, Norwich, Willimantic, or Manchester. Therefore, a more strict definition by some long-time residents of the Quiet Corner roughly defines a quadrangle encompassing the towns of Ashford or Willington in the West, Plainfield in the South, the Massachusetts border in the North, and the Rhode Island border in the East. Another possible definition of the quadrangle can be taken by drawing the Western and Southern boundary of the "Quiet Corner" at Route 198 or Route 89 in the West, and Route 14 in the South. 

Northeastern Connecticut is, in contrast to the rest of the state, far more rural, with large swaths of scenic farmland, rivers and lakes, woodlands, and state forests. Its population centers are largely rural and semi-rural historic towns (many with legacies stretching back to the American Colonial Era), and most with populations below 10,000 residents. As such, it is one of the least-urbanized districts along the Northeast Megalopolis. Many of the towns are within a long commuting distance of Boston; although none are considered a part of the Boston Metropolitan Area. Only the Interstate 395 highway corridor passes through the heart of the Quiet Corner as a nationally signed part of the Interstate Highway System, linking the area to Worcester, MA (and by extension the Massachusetts Turnpike), and also the Connecticut Shoreline. Additionally, but of less note, Interstate 84 passes near the western periphery of the region, providing a tenuous link with Hartford and the rest of the state. Although not major thoroughfares, Route 44 and Route 6 help to criss-cross the Quiet Corner, providing rural, but relatively straightforward East-West transit to both Providence, RI, and Hartford for local residents. 

Due to its relative isolation, The Quiet Corner is considered a core part of the Last Green Valley National Heritage Corridor, a source of pride and identity which many residents of the area seek to preserve.Under some definitions of the Quiet Corner, the region's largest town is Windham, including the borough of Willimantic, with a population of 25,000. Under a more conservative definition of the region, however, the largest town is Killingly, with a population of nearly 18,000. As paradoxical as it may seem, it can be noted that the Willimantic and Windham area is sometimes not considered a part of the Quiet Corner proper, as its much larger population size, urbanized/industrial setting, and location at the extreme southwestern corner of Windham County (with stronger ties to Manchester, Hartford, and Norwich) seek to divide the town from the more rural settings further north and east. It can generally be agreed upon that the core of today's Quiet Corner encompasses the towns of Pomfret, Killingly, Putnam, Woodstock, Brooklyn, Thompson, Eastford, Hampton, Chaplin, Plainfield, Canterbury, Sterling, and Scotland. Towns bordering the aforementioned region may or may not be considered a part of the Quiet Corner, depending on the resident who is asked.

Mill villages
Early industry in the area was powered by watermills set on fast rivers and streams such as the Willimantic River and the Quinebaug River. Many were built during the early part of the Industrial Revolution in conjunction with Samuel Slater's famous mills in nearby Massachusetts and Rhode Island. Indeed, many towns of the area once bolstered large textile mills and milltowns, such as the Belding Mills in Thompson and Putnam and the Plainfield Woolen Company Mill and for nearly a century (from the early 1800s to roughly the 1930s) were a major source of economic and industrial development in the region. However, by the latter half of the 20th century, many of these mills had fallen into disrepair and by the early 2000s had been dismantled. Of these surviving mill buildings, most have since been renovated into places of local business or stylish condominiums for residents. Several Quiet Corner subcommunities, North Grosvenordale in Thompson, Danielson in Killingly, and Central Village in Plainfield, to this day retain visual echoes of the historic mill-town villages.

Tourism

The Quiet Corner is popular with tourists for its traditional New England scenery and culture, namely: locally produced foods, bed and breakfasts, historic farms, inns, and town centers, stone walls, agricultural fairs, and antique shops.  Major attractions in and around the Quiet Corner include: 
  
 Route 169, a National Scenic Byway running north-and-south through the region. 
 A scenic segment of Route 44 passing through the rural woodlands of the Quiet Corner. 
 The birthplace of Samuel Huntington in Scotland.
 The Northern half of the Airline Trail, which traverses Windham to Thompson.  
 Several noted breweries and vineyards, including two Connecticut Wine Trail vineyards, Taylor Brooke and Sharpe Hill.  
 The Tourtellotte Memorial Room and Museum, the Thompson Speedway, and the West Thompson Dam in Thompson.
 Historic Roseland Cottage and the Woodstock Fair in Woodstock.
 The Wolf Den in Pomfret. 
 The Israel Putnam Monument and Brooklyn Fair in Brooklyn.
 The Lebanon Town Green and its accompanying Revolutionary War historic sites in Lebanon.  
 The Prudence Crandall House Museum in Canterbury.
 The Coventry Farmer's Market and Nathan Hale Homestead in Coventry.   
 The variety of antique shops of Pomfret, Putnam, and Woodstock. 
 The University of Connecticut flagship campus in Storrs.
 The Tri-state Marker, denoting the point where the states of Massachusetts, Rhode Island, and Connecticut touch.

The Quiet Corner has seen a resurgence in the past few decades in the production of local foods, producing local wines, cheeses, ice cream, apples, maple syrup, craft beer, and a variety of heirloom crops.

References

External links
Connecticut East Convention and Visitors Bureau
Connecticut Route 169 on American Byways

Regions of Connecticut